Ljuba may refer to:

 Ljuba (given name), a Slavic given name
 Ljuba, Serbia, a village in Syrmia, Vojvodina
 1062 Ljuba, an asteroid

See also 
 Ljubav (disambiguation)